University North of Paraná or Universidade Norte do Paraná is a private university which was created by federal decree number 70592. Administrative infrastructure includes a rectory Londrina, Brazil, pro-rectories and university council. It has campuses in the cities of Londrina, Arapongas and Bandeirantes and was credentialed to distance learning modality in July 2002, and currently possess 424 classrooms used for support in cities spread for all Brazil states.

Undergraduate programs

26 undergraduate courses
10 sequential courses

Graduate Courses (latu sensu)

50 specialization courses

Graduate Courses (stricto sensu)

Master's degree in Odontology

External links
http://www.unopar.br/
http://www.unoparvirtual.com.br/

Universities and colleges in Paraná
Educational institutions established in 1972
1972 establishments in Brazil
Education in Londrina
Private universities and colleges in Brazil